Events from the year 1724 in Scotland.

Incumbents 

 Secretary of State for Scotland: The Duke of Roxburghe

Law officers 
 Lord Advocate – Robert Dundas
 Solicitor General for Scotland – John Sinclair, jointly with Charles Binning

Judiciary 
 Lord President of the Court of Session – Lord North Berwick
 Lord Justice General – Lord Ilay
 Lord Justice Clerk – Lord Grange

Events 
 c. March–November – Galloway "Levellers" dykebreaking in opposition to enclosures.
 24 December – General George Wade is appointed Commander in Chief in Scotland after his report on the need for military roads in the country.
 Burcefield and Gardie Houses built.

Births 
 20 March – Duncan Ban MacIntyre, Gaelic poet (died 1812)
 3 June – John Gregory, physician and moralist (died 1773)
 10 July – James Hamilton, 6th Duke of Hamilton (died 1758 in England)

Deaths 
 14 November – John Murray, 1st Duke of Atholl, soldier and politician (born 1660 in England)

The arts
 Allan Ramsay publishes The Ever Green: Being a collection of Scots Poems and co-writes and edits the first volume of The Tea-Table Miscellany, a collection of Scots songs, in Scots and English.

See also 

 Timeline of Scottish history

References 

 
Years of the 18th century in Scotland
Scotland
1720s in Scotland